Farmer City is a ghost town in Wichita County, Kansas, United States.

History
It was hoped that it would become the county seat — a compromise between the fighting towns of Leoti and Coronado.  Soon after Leoti won the fight, Farmer City and most of Coronado vanished.

References

Further reading

External links
 Wichita County Maps: Current, Historic, KDOT

Former populated places in Wichita County, Kansas
Former populated places in Kansas